Elsdorf is a town in the Rhein-Erft-Kreis, in North Rhine-Westphalia, Germany. It is situated approximately 5 km south-west of Bergheim and 30 km west of Cologne.

Notable people 
 Eugen Langen (1833–1895), entrepreneur, engineer and inventor, co-founder of the Elsdorf sugar factory Pfeifer & Langen
 Werner Marx (1746–1806), General Vicar of the Archbishop of Cologne

References

Rhein-Erft-Kreis